Lake Mead is a reservoir formed by the Hoover Dam on the Colorado River in the Southwestern United States. It is the largest reservoir in the US in terms of water capacity. Lake Mead provides water to the states of Arizona, California, and Nevada as well as some of Mexico, providing sustenance to nearly 20 million people and large areas of farmland.

The lake has remained below full capacity since 1983 owing to drought and increased water demand. In a draft 2022 Colorado River annual operating plan, released by the U.S. Bureau of Reclamation, a "Shortage Condition" was expected to be declared for 2022, due to the lake level falling below , which would have resulted in a projected  curtailment in downstream water delivery.

History

The lake was named after Elwood Mead, who was the commissioner of the U.S. Bureau of Reclamation from 1924 to 1936, during the planning and construction of the Boulder Canyon Project that created the dam and lake. Lloyd Joseph Hudlow, an engineer with the Bureau of Reclamation, came to Boulder City in March 1933 to assist in the survey, and ended up as the project manager.

Lake Mead was established as the Boulder Dam Recreation Area in 1936, administered by the National Park Service. The name was changed to the Lake Mead National Recreation Area in 1947, and Lake Mohave and the Shivwits Plateau were later added to its jurisdiction. Both lakes and the surrounding area offer year-round recreation options.

The accumulated water from Hoover Dam forced the evacuation of several communities, most notably St. Thomas, Nevada, the last resident of which left the town in 1938. The ruins of St. Thomas are currently visible (as of May 23, 2022) via dirt road and hiking trail, due to Lake Mead's low water level. Lake Mead also covered the sites of the Colorado River landings of Callville and Rioville, Nevada, and the river crossing of Bonelli's Ferry, between Arizona and Nevada. Six years after the dam's construction, the lake filled to an elevation of 1200 feet.

At lower water levels, a high-water mark, or "bathtub ring", is visible in photos that show the shoreline of Lake Mead. The bathtub ring is white because of the deposition of minerals on previously submerged surfaces.

Geography

Nine main access points to the lake are available. On the west are three roads from the Las Vegas metropolitan area. Access from the north-west from Interstate 15 is through the Valley of Fire State Park and the Moapa River Indian Reservation to the Overton Arm of the lake.

The lake is divided into several bodies. The large body closest to the Hoover Dam is Boulder Basin. The narrow channel, which was once known as Boulder Canyon and is now known as The Narrows, connects Boulder Basin to Virgin Basin to the east. The Virgin River and Muddy River empty into the Overton Arm, which is connected to the northern part of the Virgin Basin. The next basin to the east is Temple Basin, and following that is Gregg Basin, which is connected to the Temple Basin by the Virgin Canyon.

In addition, two small basins, the Muddy River Inlet and the Virgin River Basin, are flooded when the lake is high enough where these two rivers flow into the lake. As of February 2015, these basins remain dry.

Jagged mountain ranges surround the lake, offering a scenic backdrop, especially at sunset. Two mountain ranges are within view of the Boulder Basin, the River Mountains, oriented northwest to southeast and the Muddy Mountains, oriented west to northeast. Bonelli Peak lies to the east of the Virgin Basin.

Las Vegas Bay is the terminus for the Las Vegas Wash which is the sole outflow from the Las Vegas Valley.

Drought and water usage issues

Lake Mead receives the majority of its water from snow melt in the Colorado, Wyoming, and Utah Rocky Mountains. Inflows to the lake are largely moderated by the upstream Glen Canyon Dam, which is required to release  of water each year to Lake Mead. Hoover Dam is required to release  of water each year, with the difference made up by tributaries that join the Colorado below Glen Canyon or flow into Lake Mead.

Before the filling of Lake Powell (a reservoir of similar size to Lake Mead) behind Glen Canyon Dam, the Colorado River flowed largely unregulated into Lake Mead, making Mead more vulnerable to drought.

In these decades prior to 2000, Glen Canyon Dam frequently released more than the required  to Lake Mead each year. That allowed Lake Mead to maintain a high water level despite releasing significantly more water than it is contracted for. Since 2000, the Colorado River has experienced the southwestern North American megadrought, with average or above-average conditions occurring in only five years (2005, 2008–2009, 2011 and 2014) in the first 16 years of the 21st century. Of any 16-year period in the last 60 years, 2000-2015 had the lowest water availability.

Although Glen Canyon was able to meet its required minimum release until 2014, the water level in Lake Mead has steadily declined. The decreasing water level is due to the loss of the surplus water that once made up for the annual overdraft.

In June 2010, the lake was at 39% of its capacity, and on November 30, 2010, it reached , setting a new record monthly low. From mid-May 2011 to January 22, 2012, Lake Mead's water elevation increased from  after a heavy snowmelt in the Rocky Mountains prompted the release of an extra  from Glen Canyon into Lake Mead.

In 2012 and 2013, the Colorado River basin experienced its worst consecutive water years on record, prompting a low Glen Canyon release in 2014 – the lowest since 1963, during the initial filling of Lake Powell – in the interest of recovering the level of the upstream reservoir, which had fallen to less than 40% capacity as a result of the drought. Consequently, Lake Mead's level fell significantly, reaching a new record low in 2014, 2015 and 2016.

If the lake is below this elevation at the beginning of the water year, an official shortage declaration by the Bureau of Reclamation will enforce water rationing in Arizona and Nevada. The water year begins October 1 to coincide with seasonal Rocky Mountain snowfall, which produces most of the Colorado River's flow.

Lake Mead's water level rebounded a few feet by October 2015 and avoided triggering the drought restrictions. The water level started falling in Spring 2016 and fell below the drought trigger level of 1,075 feet again in May 2016. Drought restrictions were narrowly avoided again when the lake level rose above 1,075 feet on September 28, 2016, three days before the deadline, and the Bureau of Land Reclamation did not issue a shortage declaration.

A reprieve from the steady annual decline occurred in 2017, when lake levels rose throughout the year due to heavier than normal snowfall in the Rocky Mountains.

Despite those and other predictions of an impending shortage determination by 2020, snowpack of 140% of average in the Upper Colorado River basin as of April 2019 resulted in 128% above average inflow into Lake Powell, resulting in  water level on Lake Mead.

Since 2018, Lake Mead water levels have remained well above the  level that would trigger a shortage determination.

As a result of the decreasing water level, marinas and boat launch ramps have either had to be relocated to another area of the lake or have closed down permanently. The Las Vegas Bay Marina was relocated in 2002 and the Lake Mead Marina was relocated in 2008 to Hemenway Harbor. Overton Marina and Echo Bay Marina have been closed due to low levels in the northern part of the Overton Arm. Government Wash, Las Vegas Bay, and Pearce Ferry boat launch ramps have been closed. Las Vegas Boat Harbor and Lake Mead Marina in Hemenway Harbor/Horsepower Cove remain open, along with Callville Bay Marina, Temple Bar Marina, Boulder Launch Area (former location of the Lake Mead Marina) and the South Cove launch ramp.

Changing rainfall patterns, climate variability, high levels of evaporation, reduced snow melt runoff, and current water use patterns are putting pressure on water management resources at Lake Mead as the population relying on it for water, and the Hoover Dam for electricity, continues to increase.

If water levels continue to drop, Hoover Dam would cease generating electricity when the water level falls below  and the lake would stabilize at a level of  when the water reaches the lowest water outlet of the dam. The  tunnel took seven years to build under the lake and was put into operation in late 2015.

According to a 2016 estimate, about 6% of Lake Mead's water evaporates annually. Covering 6 percent of Lake Mead with floating photovoltaics has a potential generating capacity of 3,400 megawatts, which is comparable to the capacity of Hoover Dam, and would reduce water lost to evaporation in the covered area by as much as 90%. A 2021 estimate stated that covering 10% of the lake's surface with foam-backed floating photovoltaics could result in "enough water conserved and electricity generated to service Las Vegas and Reno combined."

In December 2021, Arizona, California, Nevada, and the U.S. Department of the Interior signed an agreement to spend $200 million for 2022 and 2023 to subsidize water users who voluntarily reduce their usage or undertake capital projects to improve efficiency. Along with a variety of state and local regulations, this aims to retain the "500+ Plan" aims to retain  in the reservoir, which equates to 35% of capacity. At the same time an agreement was reached with the Gila River Indian Community and the Colorado River Indian Tribes which is expected to save an estimated 11 vertical feet of reservoir water.

Anthropological role in forensics 
Severe drought lowers the level of the lake, affording social anthropologists opportunities to study indigenous dwellings that were previously submerged. Meanwhile, their forensic colleagues are routinely called in whenever relatively contemporary remains of people are revealed, to investigate scientifically who the deceased might have been in life, how they died, and how their bodies got to the lake. For example, the 2020–2023 North American drought caused a series of unexplained human remains to be revealed, prompting speculation about how many more will be discovered as the water level recedes. However, this is not the first time such mysteries have surfaced at Lake Mead:

 On or about June 16, 2011 a male body was discovered floating in Lake Mead near Callville Bay.
 On May 1, 2022, a body was found in a barrel which may have been stuck in mud since the late 1970s or early 1980s. The body found in a barrel at the bottom of Lake Mead is being tested for the DNA of a man that went missing 45 years ago.
 On May 7, 2022, the remains of Thomas Erndt were found. Thomas died of an apparent drowning in 2002, but his body was never found.
 By August 15, 2022, four more bodies had been found.

Recreation and marinas

Lake Mead provides many types of recreation to locals and visitors, including boating, fishing, swimming, sunbathing, and water skiing. Four marinas are located on Lake Mead: Las Vegas Boat Harbor and Lake Mead Marina (in Hemenway Harbor, NV) operated by the Gripentogs, and Callville Bay (in Callville Bay, NV) and Temple Bar (in Arizona.) The area has many coves with rocky cliffs and sandy beaches.

Several small to medium-sized islands occur in the lake area depending on the water level. The Alan Bible Visitor Center hosts the Alan Bible Botanical Garden, a small garden of cactus and other plants native to the Mojave Desert. The Grand Wash is a recreational area located in the north side of the lake.

On October 28, 1971, Lake Mead hosted the 1st ever B.A.S.S Bassmaster Classic. This fishing site was a "mystery lake" and the 24 anglers were not told of the location of the tournament until their plane was in the air. The "winner take all" payout of $10,000 was won by Bobby Murray of Arkansas.

The Desert Princess, operated by Lake Mead Cruises, is a three-level paddle wheeler certified by the U.S. Coast Guard to carry 275 passengers. It cruises to the Hoover Dam five days a week.

B-29 crash

At the bottom of the lake is a Boeing B-29 Superfortress that crashed in 1948 while testing a prototype missile guidance system known as "suntracker".

The wreckages of at least two smaller airplanes are submerged in Lake Mead.

In popular culture

The 2018 novel Lords of St. Thomas, by Jackson Ellis, tells the story of the last family to vacate the flooded town of St. Thomas in 1938, following construction of the Hoover Dam and creation of Lake Mead.

Lake Mead, Hoover Dam, and the wrecked B-29 play a large role in the setting of the video game Fallout: New Vegas.

See also

List of drying lakes
List of reservoirs and dams in the United States

References

External links

 
 
 
 
 
 
 Lake Mead ENC Chart

 
1935 establishments in Arizona
1935 establishments in Nevada
Colorado River
 
Mead
Mead
Landmarks in Arizona
Landmarks in Nevada
Mead
Mead
Tourist attractions in Clark County, Nevada
Reservoirs in Nevada